Silvia Truu (full name Silvia Astrid Truu, until 1936 Koch, until 1941 Koht; 16 December 1922 – 5 May 1990) was an Estonian children's writer.

She was born in Paldiski. She worked at several newspapers' offices: Rahva Hääl, Noorte Hääl and Nõukogude Naine.

From 1965 she was a professional writer. Since 1973 she was a member of Estonian Writers' Union.

She died in Tallinn, and she is buried at Forest Cemetery. Her daughter is architect Meeli Truu

Works
 "Ühed targad mõlemad" (1956)
 "Murra" (1959)
 "Silja, päikesekiir ja maailm" (1967)
 "Kuu aega täiskasvanu" (1968)
 "Saa nüüd neist inimestest aru" (1970)
 "Pilvede kõrval toas" (1973)
 "Jeekim" (1974)
 "Peidus pool" (1977)
 "Oma suguvõsa Aadam" (1985)
 "Südamel ei ole kortse" (1987)

References

1922 births
1990 deaths
20th-century Estonian women writers
Estonian children's writers
Estonian women children's writers
People from Paldiski
Burials at Metsakalmistu